Platinum & Gold is a 2010 compilation album by the Swedish group Ace of Base, released in Sweden, Denmark, and Norway.

Track listing 
Disc 1:
  All That She Wants
  The Sign
  Beautiful Life
  Life Is a Flower
  Lucky Love
  Always Have, Always Will
  Wheel of Fortune
  Don't Turn Around
  C'est la Vie (Always 21)
  Beautiful Morning
  Happy Nation
  Ordinary Day
  Living in Danger
  Cruel Summer
  Unspeakable
  Hallo Hallo

Disc 2:
  Wheel of Fortune (2009 New Version)
  The Sign (Remix)
  Never Gonna Say I'm Sorry (Sweetbox Funky Mix)
  Cruel Summer (Soul Poets house Bust)
  Life Is a Flower (Soul Poets Night Club Mix)
  All That She Wants (Madness Version)
  Lucky Love (Raggasol Version)
  Beautiful Life (Lenny B's house of Joy Club Mix)
  Happy Nation (Moody Gold Mix)
  C'est la Vie (Always 21) (Remix)
  Living in Danger (D-house Mix)
  Travel to Romantis (Love to Infinity Master Mix)
  Hallo Hallo (Dub)
  Megamix (Long Version)

Charts

References

External links
Television/Web advert

Ace of Base compilation albums
2010 greatest hits albums